Pavel Ivanovich Sedko (born 3 April 1998) is a Belarusian professional footballer who plays for Dinamo Minsk.

Club career
He made his debut in the Belarusian Premier League for Dynamo Brest on 14 September 2015 in a game against Belshina Bobruisk.

He made his debut in the Russian Football National League for Torpedo Moscow on 3 October 2021 in a game against Rotor Volgograd.

On 27 June 2022, Sedko's contract with Torpedo was terminated by mutual consent.

International goal
Scores and results list Belarus' goal tally first.

Honours
Dynamo Brest
Belarusian Cup: 2016–17, 2017–18
Belarusian Super Cup: 2018, 2019

Torpedo Moscow
 Russian Football National League : 2021-22

References

External links 
 
 
 Profile at pressball.by

1998 births
Living people
Sportspeople from Brest, Belarus
Belarusian footballers
Association football midfielders
Belarus international footballers
Belarusian expatriate footballers
Expatriate footballers in Russia
FC Dynamo Brest players
FC Rukh Brest players
FC Torpedo Moscow players
FC Gomel players
FC Dinamo Minsk players